Katapult is a discontinued free application launcher for the KDE desktop environment.

Katapult may also refer to:

 Katapult (album), an album by Finnish rock band Circle

See also
 Catapult (disambiguation)